"Vigilante Shit" is a song written and recorded by American singer-songwriter Taylor Swift from her tenth studio album Midnights (2022). Produced by Swift and Jack Antonoff, the music is built around bubbling beats, swirling synths, industrial elements, and snare drums. Lyrically, it is a "noirish" vengeance declaration, taking aim at an enemy and encourages other women to do the same. The song peaked at number nine on the Billboard Global 200 and number 10 on the US Billboard Hot 100, and charted within the top 10 in Canada, Malaysia, and the Philippines. It was performed for the first time on the Eras Tour (2023).

Background and release
On August 28, 2022, Swift announced her tenth studio album, Midnights, set for release on October 21, 2022. The track-list was not immediately revealed. Jack Antonoff, a longtime collaborator of Swift who had worked with her since 1989 (2014), was confirmed as a producer on Midnights by a video posted to Swift's Instagram account on September 16, 2022. On September 21, 2022, Swift began unveiling the track-list in a randomized order through her 13-episode short video series on TikTok, called Midnights Mayhem with Me. In each episode, Swift rolls a lottery cage containing 13 ping pong balls numbered from one to thirteen, each representing a track of Midnights, and when a ball drops out, she disclosed the title of the corresponding track on the album, through a telephone. In the second episode, released on September 23, 2022, Swift announced "Vigilante Shit" would be track eight. The song alongside the thirteen announced tracks and additional surprise-released tracks for the 3am edition of Midnights, was released on October 21, 2022 under Republic Records.

Commercial performance
Globally, "Vigilante Shit" received over 11.8 million streams on Spotify in its first 24 hours, becoming the seventh-most streamed song on that day, following six additional songs from Midnights. It remained on the Spotify Weekly Top Songs for six weeks, peaking at number nine. The song peaked at number nine on the Global 200, compiled by Billboard.

In the United States, "Vigilante Shit" debuted at number 10 on the Billboard Hot 100, receiving 32.2 million streams, selling 6,400 digital downloads, and reaching an airplay audience of 424,000 in its first week. During the week of its release, Swift became the first artist to occupy the top 10 of the Hot 100. The song remained on the chart for six weeks. It peaked at number nine on the Canadian Hot 100 and was certified gold by Music Canada on November 16, 2022. Elsewhere, "Vigilante Shit" entered numerous territories, peaking within the top 50 in the Philippines (9), Australia (10), Malaysia (10), Iceland (17), Vietnam (18), India (20), Luxembourg (24), South Africa (24), Switzerland (39), Hungary (40), and Sweden (41), and further reaching Spain (63) and France (133).

Credits and personnel 
Credits are adapted from Pitchfork and the liner notes of Midnights.
Recording
 Recorded at Rough Customer Studio, Brooklyn and Electric Lady Studios, New York City
 Mixed at MixStar Studios, Virginia Beach
 Mastered at Sterling Sound, Edgewater, New Jersey
 Evan Smith's performance was recorded by herself at Pleasure Hill Recording, Portland, Maine
 Dominik Rivinius' performance was recorded by Ken Lewis at Neon Wave Studio, Pirmasens, Germany

Personnel
 Taylor Swift – vocals, songwriting, production
 Jack Antonoff – production, engineering, programming, synths, percussion, juno 6, wurlitzer, Moog, recording
 Evan Smith – engineering, synths
 Dominik Rivinius – drums
 Laura Sisk – engineering, recording
 Ken Lewis – engineering
 Megan Searl – assistant engineering
 John Sher – assistant engineering
 John Rooney – assistant engineering
 Jonathan Garcia – assistant engineering
 Serban Ghenea – mixing
 Bryce Bordone – assistant mixing
 Randy Merrill – mastering

Charts

Certifications

References

2022 songs
Taylor Swift songs
Songs written by Taylor Swift
Song recordings produced by Taylor Swift
Song recordings produced by Jack Antonoff